Lewisburg Historic District is a national historic district located at Lewisburg, Union County, Pennsylvania.  The district includes 853 contributing buildings, 2 contributing sites, 11 contributing structures, and 2 contributing objects in the central business district and surrounding residential areas of Lewisburg.  Notable buildings include the Derr House (1773), 19th century and early-20th century Bucknell University buildings including Old Main and Bucknell Hall, Union County Courthouse (1856), U.S. Courthouse and Post Office (1933), Himmelreich Library (1902), First Presbyterian Church (1856), Christ Lutheran Church (1901), Union National Bank (1899), McClure Building (1913), Campus Theatre (1939), and the Buffalo Mills (1883). Also located in the district are the separately listed Chamberlin Iron Front Building, Packwood House-American Hotel, and Reading Railroad Freight Station. Contributing sites are the Lewisburg Cemetery and Soldiers Memorial Field. The contributing structures include five railroad bridges and the contributing objects are the Soldiers Memorial Monument (1901) and a commemorative plaque.

It was added to the National Register of Historic Places in 2004.

References

Historic districts on the National Register of Historic Places in Pennsylvania
Buildings and structures in Union County, Pennsylvania
National Register of Historic Places in Union County, Pennsylvania